Line Creek flows into the Grass River in Buck Bridge, New York.

References 

Rivers of St. Lawrence County, New York